Woo Moon-gi  (born 1983), is a South Korean film director. Woo's directorial feature debut, the indie sports comedy The King of Jokgu (2013), has won various awards, including Best New Director and Special Jury Prize at the 20th Chunsa Film Art Awards, and Best Independent Film Director at the 15th Director's Cut Awards.

Career 
Born in 1983, Woo studied Film and Video at Hongik University and is currently majoring in filmmaking at the Korea National University of Arts. He made a few shorts such as Between Hot and Cold (2008), Trembling (2009) and The Boy's Physics (2010). He also worked as assistant director on the film Modern Boy (2008) and as storyboard artist on Manshin: Ten Thousand Spirits (2014) and The Legacy (2014).

In 2013, Woo's directorial feature debut, the indie sports comedy The King of Jokgu (2013), made its world premiere at the 18th Busan International Film Festival. Released in 2014, the film was a sensation, attracting over 40,000 viewers, unheard of for an indie comedy in Korea. The film also picked up five nominations at the 2nd Wildflower Film Awards, winning Best Actor for Ahn Jae-hong.

Filmography 
Between Hot and Cold (short film, 2008) - director, screenwriter 
Modern Boy (2008) - assistant director
Trembling (short film, 2009) - director, screenwriter 
The Boy's Physics (short film, 2010) - director, screenwriter
Mongoo Speaking (short film, 2012) - director, screenwriter  
Lost in Transportation (short film, 2012) - director, screenwriter 
The Sunshine Boys (2013) - art director
The King of Jokgu (2013) - director, script editor 
Manshin: Ten Thousand Spirits (documentary, 2014) - storyboard artist
The Legacy (2014) - storyboard artist, actor
Woman, Man (segment: "Sad Scene") (2015) - director
Collective Invention (2015) - actor
Familyhood (2016) - screenwriter
The Queen of Crime (2016) - actor

Awards 
2015 20th Chunsa Film Art Awards: Best New Director (The King of Jokgu)
2015 20th Chunsa Film Art Awards: Special Jury Prize (The King of Jokgu)
2015 15th Director's Cut Awards: Best Independent Film Director (The King of Jokgu)

References

External links 
 
 
 

1983 births
Living people
South Korean film directors
South Korean screenwriters
Hongik University alumni
Korea National University of Arts alumni